Metallurg Stadium is an all-seater football stadium in Alaverdi, Armenia, Armenia.

Overview
Metallurg Stadium was built in 1970 on the right bank of Debed river. Between 1970 and 1993, it served as a home venue for the local football team Debed during the Armenian Premier League matches.

Currently the stadium is owned by the "Armenian Copper Programme" Closed Joint-Stock Company of Vallex Group, and holds a capacity of 743 seats.

It is mainly used as a training ground by the local youth teams of the Lori Province.

Gallery

References

Football venues in Armenia
Buildings and structures in Lori Province
1970 establishments in Armenia
Sports venues completed in 1970
Sport in Lori Province